Haqverdilər (also, Akhverdi and Akhverdili) is a village in the Neftchala Rayon of Azerbaijan.  The village forms part of the municipality of Yeniqışlaq.

References 

Populated places in Neftchala District